Sea-Eye is a German non-governmental organization headquartered in Regensburg. It participates in the rescue of migrants in distress in the Mediterranean, in particular by having chartered the ships Sea-Eye and Seefuchs/ Sea Fox until August 2017, then the Alan Kurdi (named in memory of the young Syrian found drowned on a Turkish beach in 2015) and since August 2020 the Sea-Eye 4. In June 2021, Sea-Eye received honorary citizenship from the mayor of Palermo.

Operations
On 3 April 2019, the Alan Kurdi, warned after a call to the emergency number of the (German) Watch the Mediterranean Sea association, rescued 64 migrants (including twelve women and two children aged one and six) off the Libyan coast; Italy and Malta initially refused berthing but after ten days of waiting at sea, the migrants were finally permitted to disembark at the port of Valletta and were divided between Germany, France (twenty of them), Portugal and Luxembourg.

On 5 July 2019, off the coast of Libya, Sea Eye rescued 65 migrants from drowning.
On 7 July 2019 65 migrants were disembarked from Alan Kurdi in Naples.

On 4 August 2019 Alan Kurdi disembarked forty migrants in Malta.

References 

Sea rescue organizations
European migrant crisis
Immigrant rights activism
Humanitarian aid organizations in Europe
Refugee aid organizations in Europe